This is list of Indonesian snacks. In Indonesian, snacks are called kudapan, makanan kecil (lit. "small food") or makanan ringan (lit. "light food"). They might taste savoury or sweet, snack foods are a significant aspect of Indonesian cuisine which is very diverse. Traditional kue snacks — a collection of steamed or fried snacks with rice-flour and coconut sugar-based ingredients, exist in many forms. While traditional crackers of krupuk and kripik chips were also a popular crispy choice.

Crackers, chips and crisps

Fritters

Dumplings

Savoury snacks

Tofu-based snacks

Kue basah or traditional cakes

Kue kering or cookies and biscuits

Pastry, bread and cake

Liquid snacks, porridges and beverages

Seeds, beans and peanuts

See also

Cuisine of Indonesia
Kue
List of Indonesian beverages
List of Indonesian desserts
List of Indonesian dishes
List of Indonesian soups
List of snack foods
List of snack foods by country
Street food of Indonesia

References

Snacks